Chilliwack() is a city in the province of British Columbia, Canada. Chilliwack is surrounded by mountains and home to recreational areas such as Cultus Lake and Chilliwack Lake Provincial Parks.  There are numerous outdoor activities in the area in which to participate, including hiking, rock climbing, mountain biking horseback riding, whitewater kayaking, camping, fishing, golf and paragliding. Chilliwack is known for its annual corn harvest, and is home to the Province's second largest independent bookstore The Book Man. The Fraser Valley Regional District is headquartered in Chilliwack, which is the Fraser Valley's second largest city after Abbotsford. 

The city had a population of 93,203 in the 2021 Canadian census, with a census metropolitan area population of 113,767 people.

Etymology 

In Halq'eméylem, the language of the Stó:lō communities around Chilliwack and Sardis, Tcil'Qe'uk means "valley of many streams". It also lends its name to the Chilliwack River, and group of aboriginal people, the Ts'elxwéyeqw (also spelt Ts'elxwíqw or Sts'elxwíqw). The spelling of Chilliwack is sometimes a matter of confusion. Prior to the amalgamation of the City of Chilliwack and the Municipality of Chilliwhack, there were two different spellings. When amalgamated, the current spelling of the city was adopted. Anglicized spellings include "Chilliwhyeuk" and other versions closer to the original Halq'eméylem.

History 

The archaeological record shows evidence of Stó:lō people in the Fraser Valley, or S'ólh Téméxw, 10,000 years ago. Permanent structures in the Chilliwack area date from around 5,000 years ago. It is estimated that at the time of the first contact with Europeans, there were as many as 40,000 people living within Stó:lō territory.

By 1859, over 40,000 gold miners had trekked to the goldfields of the upper Fraser River, many travelling through the Chilliwack area. By the mid-1860s, several farms had grown up around the steamboat landings on the Fraser River called Miller's Landing, Minto Landing, Sumas Landing and Chilliwack Landing.

The Township of Chilliwhack was incorporated in 1873, the third municipality in British Columbia. The initial settlement was along the Fraser River at Chilliwack Landing. Steamboats were the main mode of transportation, carrying goods and passengers between Chilliwack and New Westminster. After the construction of the Canadian Pacific Railway in 1885, many residents began to cross the Fraser River at Minto Landing to catch the train at Harrison Mills.

With little room for expansion along the river, the commercial area of the town moved south to the junction of the New Westminster-Yale Wagon Road, Wellington Avenue and Young Road, called "Five Corners". A large subdivision called Centreville was built in 1881. The name "Centreville" was replaced In 1887 by the more popular "Chilliwack."

The Chilliwack area experienced extensive flooding in the 1894 Fraser River flood.

The Chilliwack (formerly Centreville) area was incorporated in 1908 as a separate municipality, the City of Chilliwack. The city and the township co-existed for 72 years.

The Chilliwack area again experienced extensive flooding in the 1948 Fraser River flood.

In 1980, the Township of Chilliwhack and the City of Chilliwack merged to form the District of Chilliwack. The District of Chilliwack became the City of Chilliwack in early 1999. Chilliwack has the largest number of rainbow crosswalks in BC despite City Council's decision not to install more.

In November 2021, an atmospheric river caused widespread flooding in Chilliwack, forcing major roads, including Highway 1, to close indefinitely. The Highway has since been reopened for traffic in this area.

Geography 

Chilliwack is located in the Upper Fraser Valley, 100 kilometres (60 mi) east of Vancouver on the Trans-Canada Highway. The city is bounded on the north by the Fraser River, and on the south by the Canada-United States border.

Chilliwack is surrounded by tall mountain peaks, such as Mount Cheam and Slesse Mountain, and large rivers (the Fraser and Vedder).

Geology 
The Chilliwack Batholith forms much of the North Cascades in southwestern British Columbia, Canada and the U.S. state of Washington. The geological structure is primarily named after the City of Chilliwack, where it is the most notable geological feature.

The Chilliwack Batholith is part of the Pemberton Volcanic Belt and is the largest mass of exposed intrusive rock in the Cascade Volcanic Arc. The age of the Chilliwack batholith ranges from 26 to 29 million years old.

Cityscape 

The city is made up of several amalgamated villages and communities. The urban core follows a north–south axis bisected by the Trans-Canada Highway. The city is bounded in the north by the Fraser River, in the east by the Eastern Hillsides, in the south by the Canada–US border, and in the west by the Vedder Canal.

Neighbourhoods

Neighbourhoods on the north side 
Also referred to as "Chilliwack Proper Village West", the north side covers the area from the Trans-Canada Highway in the south, to the Fraser River in the north, and includes the communities of Camp River, Chilliwack Mountain, Downtown Chilliwack, East Chilliwack, Fairfield Island, Rosedale and Popkum. Downtown Chilliwack is the historical urban centre of the city. Several cultural attractions, such as the Chilliwack Coliseum, Chilliwack Cultural Centre, The Book Man and the Eagle Landing Shopping Centre are located there, as well as key government buildings, such as city hall, FVRD offices, and the Provincial Court of British Columbia.

Neighbourhoods on the south side 
The south side includes the communities of Atchelitz, Cultus Lake Park, Greendale, Promontory Heights, Ryder Lake, Sardis, Vedder Crossing, Garrison Crossing and Yarrow. Sardis is the urban core of the south side and is a popular shopping destination.

Parks 
 Bridal Veil Falls Provincial Park
Cheam Wetlands Regional Park
 Chilliwack Heritage Park
 Chilliwack Lake Provincial Park
 Cultus Lake Provincial Park
 Fairfield Park
 Great Blue Heron Nature Reserve
 Gwynne Vaughn Park
 Island 22
 Salish Park
 Sardis Park
 Townsend Park

Arts and culture

Music 

Chilliwack has an active rock music scene, centering mostly around young ska and punk rock bands. Bands originating in Chilliwack include: These Kids Wear Crowns, Mystery Machine, and The Darkest of the Hillside Thickets.

Chilliwack also has a thriving classical music community, featuring the Chilliwack Symphony Orchestra and the Chilliwack Metropolitan Orchestra.

The drumline from Sardis Secondary School played at several venues during the 2010 Winter Olympics in Vancouver.

Chilliwack also offers many other community events and classes throughout the year. The Downtown Chilliwack Business Improvement Association is hosting music in Central Park on Saturdays for the month of August 2022.

Despite their name, the band Chilliwack was actually formed, and is based, in nearby Vancouver.

Performing arts 
The Chilliwack Cultural Centre is a performing arts venue located in downtown Chilliwack. The building is home to the Chilliwack Players' Guild (the resident theatre company), as well as the Chilliwack Academy of Music.

The UFV Theatre is a 206-seat thrust stage venue formerly belonging to the University of the Fraser Valley (UFV) Theatre Department. Until 2017, UFV produced three or four mainstage shows each year, as well as the annual Directors' Festival, which featured student directors and performers from UFV, Capilano University, Thompson Rivers University, University of Victoria, UBC and Douglas College. As of 2021, the theatre is part of the Imagine High public high school.

The Chilliwack School of Performing Arts provides pre-professional training in acting, singing and dancing to children ages 3–18 at their downtown location. The mainstage show performs a two-week run every January at the Chilliwack Cultural Centre, and a Spring Festival featuring performances from many age groups in late May. Programs at the Chilliwack Performing Arts can be registered for at. Many different programs are available, including a Junior Musical Theatre and Summer Break Camps.

Public Art 

The Chilliwack Mural Festival occurs annually.  Co-founded and Directed by Amber Price and Lise Oakley, their volunteer team has curated and directed the installation of over three dozen works of large scale original art in Historic Downtown Chilliwack.

Murals by Canadian Artists Emmanuel Jarus, Jason Botkin  and Chris Perez  can be found along with other public art via the Chilliwack Public Art Trail

Festivals 
Annual events and festivals include: 
 Chilliwack Bluegrass Festival (ended in 2013) 
 Christmas Craft Market
 Chilliwack Art of Wine Festival
 Fraser Valley Culture and Craft Beer Festival
 Fraser Valley Women's Expo
 Party in the Park (ended 2019)
 Chilliwack Canada Day
 Chilliwack Mural Festival
 Chilliwack Pride Festival

Museums 
 Chilliwack Sports Hall of Fame
 Canadian Military Education Centre 
 Chilliwack Museum and Archives, located in the 1912 former Chilliwack City Hall on Spadina Avenue, is a National Historic Site of Canada. The Chilliwack Museum and Archives are a non-profit organization operated by the Chilliwack Museum and Historical Society which began in 1958 by brothers Oliver and Casey Wells.

Notable people 

Academics
 Carin Bondar, Ph.D., biologist and celebrity science communicator
 Allan Brooks , Ornithologist and distinguished wildlife artist
 Charlotte Froese Fischer, Ph.D., mathematician and computer scientist
 Wayne Smith, M.Econ, Chief Statistician of Canada
 Rita Steblin, Ph.D., musicologist in Vancouver and Vienna, Austria
 Homer Thompson, Ph.D., classical archaeologist and excavator of the Ancient Agora of Athens

Activists
 Tony Clarke, activist, who graduated from Chilliwack Senior Secondary.
 Betty Fox, cancer research activist, mother of Terry Fox.

 Athletes
 Amber Allen, former professional soccer player with the Vancouver Whitecaps.
 Dave Archibald, former professional hockey player with the Minnesota North Stars and Ottawa Senators.
 Jordyn Huitema, soccer player for Paris Saint-Germain.
 Rick Klassen, former professional football player with the BC Lions and Saskatchewan Roughriders.

 Arts and entertainment
 Patrick Gallagher, actor from Glee, True Blood and Night At The Museum. Graduated from Chilliwack Senior Secondary.
 Bernie Herms, Grammy Award-winning artist
 Bria Skonberg, jazz musician, Juno Award winner for Vocal Jazz Album of the Year in 2017
 Tasha Tilberg, Covergirl model. Born in Chilliwack on July 23, 1979. Appeared on the covers of magazines such as Vogue, Harper's Bazaar and Marie Claire. 
 Jim Vallance, musician, songwriter, composer, arranger and producer

 Canadian Military
 Piper James C. Richardson, recipient of the Victoria Cross

 Journalists
 Jack McGaw, journalist and radio operator.
 Diana Swain, television journalist. Graduated from Chilliwack High School in 1983.

 Justices
 William H. Davies , Supreme Court Justice and Chair of the Davies Commission Inquiry

Politicians
 Dorothy Kostrzewa, first Chinese-Canadian woman elected to political office in Canada
 Barry Penner , former Attorney General
 Steven Point, first aboriginal Lieutenant-Governor of British Columbia.
 Chuck Strahl, former member of Parliament and cabinet minister

Writers
 Allan Fotheringham, columnist. Worked for The Chilliwack Progress as a student.
 Gayle Friesen, novelist
 W.P. Kinsella, author of Shoeless Joe, lived in Chilliwack.

 Others
 Keith Hunter Jesperson, serial killer who committed crimes in Canada and the U.S
 Prest Family - One of the pioneer Chilliwack families

Media

Newspapers 
Chilliwack Progress - British Columbia's oldest community newspaper, published continuously with the same name in the same community since April 1891
Chilliwack Times published its final edition on December 28, 2016.

Radio 
FM 89.5 - CHWK-FM
FM 91.7 - CBYF-FM
FM 98.3 - CKSR-FM
FM 99.9 - CBU-FM-7
FM 102.1 - CBUF-FM-1
FM 107.5 - CKKS-FM

Television 
Channel 11 CHAN-TV-1 Global

Sports 

The British Columbia Hockey League's Chilliwack Chiefs, play at the Chilliwack Coliseum. The team used to be the Quesnel Millionaires. The franchise was purchased and moved to Chilliwack by the Chiefs Development group. They started in the BCHL's Interior Conference for the 2011/2012 BCHL Season. While the original Junior "A" team, the Chilliwack Chiefs, plays in Langley, British Columbia, as the Langley Rivermen (the Chiefs Development Group sold their interest in the Langley Chiefs but retained the 'Chiefs' name and history). The Western Hockey League's Chilliwack Bruins used to play at the Prospera Centre. The expansion franchise began to play in 2006 and ended when the team was sold at the end of the 2011 season. It became the Victoria Royals WHL hockey team in 2011.

Community sports include hockey, lacrosse, softball, soccer, football, baseball, field hockey and swimming. 
The Canadian Junior Football League's Chilliwack Huskers play at Exhibition Stadium.

Chilliwack Turbo Fastball club won the 1997 Canadian Jr. Men's National Championships. In 2013 the team was an inaugural induction into the Chilliwack Sports Hall of Fame.

Chilliwack's minor baseball Cougars were the 2003 Midget AAA Provincial champions as well as the 2006 Western Canadian tier 2 champions.

Chilliwack Cougars College Prep Baseball Team won the Provincial Championship in 2016, 2017 and 2019. Most recent title against the Ridge Meadows Royals

Chilliwack hosted the 2007-2008 Synchronized Skating Canadian Championships at the Prospera Centre.

Chilliwack Minor Hockey Association was organized in 1958 with the opening of the Chilliwack Coliseum.

Climate 

The climate is typical oceanic (Köppen: Cfb) but with some influence of the land mass being some distance from the sea, similar to Orléans, France (although the former has a precipitation more than twice as long and with a tendency towards the Mediterranean pattern). Chilliwack's mild climate with limited extremes provides excellent growing conditions for a wide variety of crops and agricultural products. In fact, when averaged from 1981 to 2010, Chilliwack had one of the warmest mean temperatures for any city in Canada. 

Precipitation falls mostly as rain, with snow limited to the surrounding mountains, except for two or three weeks per year generally in December or January when artic outflow occurs. Chilliwack enjoys some of the warmest average high temperatures in Canada, with 15.5 °C (59.9 °F) being the yearly average high.

Chilliwack receives nearly the same number of days of precipitation (184.6 days at greater than 0.2 mm) as comparable local communities nearer Vancouver such as Maple Ridge (185.8 days) and the City of Mission (186.0 days) (Environment Canada Statistics). Summers in Chilliwack are usually sunny and warm, with long days (light out until well after 10 pm in June with dusk that lasts for hours) and with occasional stretches of heat where temperatures rise above .

Due to its location at the eastern end of the Fraser Valley, there has been some debate about preserving Chilliwack's air quality. However, the 2011 World Health Organization's study of air quality shows that Chilliwack enjoys air quality among the best in the world. For PM10 (10 µm) size particulates, Canada averaged third best in the world (along with Australia) at an average of 13 micrograms per cubic metre. The City of Chilliwack and the Greater Vancouver Regional District were tied at a low 8.0 MPCM. For smaller particulate of 2.5 µm size (PM2.5), "the City of Chilliwack averaged 4.9 micrograms per cubic metre. Vancouver also had 4.9, Calgary had 5.6, Winnipeg had 5.6, Toronto had 7.9, Montreal had 11.2 and Sarnia had 12.7."

Demographics

City of Chilliwack 

Ethnicity 

Note: Totals greater than 100% due to multiple origin responses.

Religion 
According to the 2021 census, religious groups in Chilliwack included:
Irreligion (45,475 persons or 49.4%)
Christianity (41,875 persons or 45.5%)
Sikhism (1,570 persons or 1.7%)
Islam (750 persons or 0.8%)
Buddhism (575 persons or 0.6%)
Hinduism (575 persons or 0.6%)
Judaism (120 persons or 0.1%)
Indigenous Spirituality (105 persons or 0.1%)

Chilliwack CMA 

Economy 
Chilliwack is part of the Lower Mainland-Southwest economic region. Chilliwack's service and retail sectors account for approximately 50% of GDP. Other growing industries include manufacturing accounting for 13%, construction at 8% and agriculture and forestry at 5% of Chilliwack's GDP.

Canadian Forces Base Chilliwack

Second World War 

CFB Chilliwack was established in 1941 as Camp Chilliwack following Canada's entry into the Second World War in 1939. After the outbreak of the Pacific War the camp was expanded to garrison Canadian Army units for the defence of Canada's West Coast. The base was also a training facility: 112 Canadian Army Basic Training Centre and A6 Canadian Engineering Training Centre were housed at Chilliwack until the war's end in 1945.

1945–1997 

During the Cold War, the base was used as a permanent training facility and the garrison for the Canadian Army units of British Columbia. The base housed the Royal Canadian School of Military Engineering, formerly A6 Canadian Engineering Training Centre and 58 Field Engineer Squadron which was transferred from CFB Esquimalt on Vancouver Island.

Following the unification of the Canadian forces in 1968, the base was renamed Canadian Forces Base Chilliwack (CFB Chilliwack). The base housed the following units:
 Canadian Forces School of Military Engineering (CFSME—formerly Royal Canadian School of Military Engineering)
 Canadian Forces Officer Candidate School (CFOCS) (transferred in 1971 to CFB Chilliwack)
 First Combat Engineer Regiment (1CER—formerly 58 Field Engineer Squadron)

In 1994, the Princess Patricia's Canadian Light Infantry 3rd Battalion (3PPCLI) was transferred from CFB Esquimalt to CFB Chilliwack, the last unit to be transferred to the base.

Due to Department of National Defence cutbacks at the end of the Cold War, the base was closed in 1997. CFOCS was transferred to Area Support Unit St-Jean in Quebec (ASU St-Jean), CFSME transferred to CFB Gagetown, 3PPCLI and 1CER were transferred to CFB Edmonton.

Legacy 

Part of CFB Chilliwack became a residential subdivision known as Garrison Crossing, and its training facilities became the Canada Education Park, a campus for a number of post-secondary schools. The Chilcotin Training Area, better known as Area C, is still operational and is part of the Western Area Training Centre (WATC). Area C is used by the Primary Reserves units of British Columbia for field training and for the use of its firing ranges. The ASU is also used by Cadets for field training. The ASU also houses supply depots for the Canadian Army units of 39 Canadian Brigade Group and the cadet units of BC. The old quartermaster warehouse is now the Canadian Military Education Centre Museum.

Transportation

Airports 

Chilliwack Airport is a small regional airport located in Downtown Chilliwack. It has  of paved and lit runway that includes a parallel taxiway. Approximately 70% of the estimated 60,000 annual air traffic movements are itinerant traffic that consists of both pilot training and recreational flights from all around BC and south of the border.

Bicycle lanes 

Highways 

A four-lane to six-lane expressway from Horseshoe Bay to Hope runs through Chilliwack on the Lower Mainland section of the Trans-Canada Highway.

The Agassiz-Rosedale Highway is a north–south route in the eastern part of Chilliwack that acts as the last connection between Highways 1 and 7 eastbound before Hope, and is the main access to the resort village of Harrison Hot Springs. The highway first opened in 1953, originally going between Yale Road in Rosedale and Highway 7, with a ferry across the Fraser River. A bridge replaced the ferry in 1956. When the section of Highway 1 east of Chilliwack opened in 1961, Highway 9 was extended south to a junction with the new Highway 1 alignment, which replaced Yale Road as the main route between Chilliwack and Hope.

Mass transit 

Chilliwack Transit System consists of a fleet of 9 buses that operate along regularly scheduled routes throughout the metropolitan area.

Rail 

Chilliwack Railway Station

Education

Post-secondary 

Canada Education Park (CEP) is an  campus in the Vedder Crossing neighbourhood on the south side of Chilliwack that houses several post-secondary institutions, including the University of the Fraser Valley, the RCMP Pacific Region Training Centre, and the Justice Institute of British Columbia.

The University of the Fraser Valley (UFV) is the largest post-secondary school in Chilliwack, and the seventh largest in British Columbia in terms of full-time enrollment. It offers master's degrees, bachelor's degrees, associate degrees, diplomas, certificates and citations across a range of programs in fine arts, humanities, science, social sciences, applied communication, business, nursing, as well as technical and trade programs. Its campuses are located in Abbotsford, Chilliwack, Hope and Mission.

Private

Public 

The Conseil scolaire francophone de la Colombie-Britannique operates one Francophone school: école La Vérendrye primary school.

See also 

Chilliwack City Council
Chilliwack-Fraser Canyon
Chilliwack-Hope
Neighbourhoods in Chilliwack
Chilliwack (band)

Notes

References

External links

 
Cities in British Columbia
Populated places on the Fraser River